Sairat is a 2016 Indian Marathi-language romantic tragedy film directed by Nagraj Manjule and produced by Manjule himself under his banner Aatpat Production along with Nittin Keni and Nikhil Sane under Essel Vision Productions and Zee Studios. Starring Rinku Rajguru and Akash Thosar in their debuts, it tells the story of two young college students from different castes who fall in love, sparking conflict between their families.

Manjule conceived the story in 2009, basing it on his experiences of caste discrimination, but scrapped it when he decided that it was boring. After making Fandry (2013), he revisited the story and completed its script the following year. The screenplay was written by Manjule, and his brother Bharat penned the dialogues. The film was shot in Manjule's village, Jeur in Karmala Taluka of Solapur district in Maharashtra. Sudhakar Reddy Yakkanti was the director of photography, and Kutub Inamdar edited the film.

Sairat premiered at the 66th Berlin International Film Festival, where it received a standing ovation. It was released on 29 April 2016 in Maharashtra and several other locations in India, receiving positive reviews from critics. The film was a box-office success, and became the highest-grossing Marathi film of all time. Rajguru received the National Film Award – Special Mention at the 63rd National Film Awards. Sairat received 11 awards at the 2017 Filmfare Marathi Awards, including Best Film, Best Director (Manjule), Best Actress (Rajguru) and Best Music Album. Rajguru and Thosar won in the Best Debut female and male categories. The film was remade in several languages: Manasu Mallige (2017) in Kannada, Channa Mereya (2017) in Punjabi, Laila O Laila (2017) in Odia, Noor Jahaan (2018) in Bengali and Dhadak (2018) in Hindi.

Plot
Prashant "Parshya" Kale is a low-caste young boy whose father is a fisherman. He does well in school, and is captain of the local cricket team. Archana "Archi" Patil is the daughter of a wealthy, upper-caste landlord and politician. Headstrong and also academically proficient, she enjoys driving a tractor and motorcycle. As they study in college, they fall in love and find ways to spend time with each other.

At a birthday celebration for Archi's younger brother, Prince, they meet in the backyard and are discovered by Archi's family. Her father, Tatya, beats Parshya and his friends. Realising that there is no way out, Archi and Parshya try to elope; they are discovered by the police, and are taken into custody. Tatya forces the police to register a false complaint that Archi was gang-raped by Parshya and his friends. Archi destroys the complaint, insisting that Parshya and his friends be released. Soon afterwards, Tatya's goons beat Parshya and his friends. Archi grabs a pistol from them, threatening to shoot unless Parshya and his friends are released. She and Parshya jump on a moving train and escape the confines of their small town to Hyderabad.

In the city, Archi and Parshya are broke and desperate. Surviving with what little they have, they are turned away from a lodge. The lovers sleep at the railway station, contemplating their next move. One night, several men awaken them and insist that they come to the police station. On the way, the men beat Parshya and one tries to rape Archi. A woman from a nearby slum, Suman Akka who lives with her young son, intervenes and saves Archi and Parshya from certain tragedy.

Akka offers Parshya and Archi a spare shack to live in, and helps Archi find employment in a bottling factory; Parshya begins working as a cook at Akka's dosa stall. Archi slowly learns Telugu with the help of her coworker, Pooja. She begins to feel homesick, and is uncomfortable living in the slums. Archi and Parshya earn a meager living, trying to make the most of their situation with love, but begin to argue. After a heated argument Archi decides to return home and Parshya almost hangs himself before Archi changes her mind and returns to him. They marry at the registrar's office, and Archi becomes pregnant.

Several years later, Parshya and Archi are better off financially and living in a better place. Archi phones her mother and hands the phone to her young son, Aakash. After the phone call, Prince and his relatives arrive with gifts from her mother in an apparent reconciliation. Aakash visits a neighbour; Archi and Parshya invite Prince and the other visitors into their flat, and serve them tea. Aakash returns with the neighbour who leaves him at his doorstep and sees his parents on the floor, bloody and hacked to death.

Cast
 Rinku Rajguru as Archana "Archi" Patil
 Akash Thosar as Prashant "Parshya" Kale 
 Tanaji Galgunde as Pradeep Bansode (Langdya/Balya)
 Arbaz Shaikh as Salim Shaikh(Salya)
 "Suresh Vishwakarma" as Tatya, Archi's father
 Geeta Chavan as Archi's mother
 Jyoti Subhash as Saguna Aatya 
 Chhaya Kadam as Suman Akka
 Anuja Muley as Annie
 Rubina Inamdar as Sapna
 Dhananjay Nanavare as Mangesh (Mangya)
 Suraj Pawar as Prince, Archi's younger brother
 Sambhaji Tangde as Parshya's father
 Vaibhavi Pardeshi as Parshya's mother
 Nagraj Manjule as a cricket commentator
 Bhushan Manjule as Shahi

Production

Development
Writer-director Nagraj Manjule wrote Sairat as a "classic love story" and a "story of impossible love", based on his own experiences of caste discrimination. He chose his own village, Jeur in Karmala Taluka of Solapur district, Maharashtra as the setting. Over two years, Manjule worked on 50 drafts of the screenplay before "intuition took over as the muse". Manjule said that the film is about "the challenges of an inter-caste romance, but in a mainstream format." He had begun working on the story of Sairat in 2009, but left it after he found it "boring". After writing the script, he read it to his family and friends and saw how it "moved people". Manjule finished the script in December 2014. The dialogue was written by his brother, Bharat.

Manjule then directed Fandry (2013), which was also based on caste discrimination. While editing it, he came across the story of Sairat after he realised that many people did not watch Fandry because of its lack of songs, and decided to make a more commercial film. He said that he wrote the script after much deliberation: "I will tell my story, but I will tell it your way and then you will watch it." Manjule decided to tell the story from a woman's perspective, since he was "fed up of the male-dominated culture and the films" with a "muscular hero saving the damsel in distress". He added "colour" to the character, making her strong because he also wanted to address gender bias in society. Manjule made Archi do what men do, and made Parshya "sensible and capable", "imbibing good qualities of women in men." Several scenes, such as Parshya jumping into a well, were drawn from Manjule's life. He called the film's title self-explanatory that might imply "freedom of thought, liberation and progressive ideas" for some and "sheer wildness and recklessness" for others. According to Manjule, the film's "takeaway" is that "lovers shouldn't be subjected to violence."

Casting
Manjule chose students with no acting background for the lead roles. 15 year old Rinku Rajguru went with her mother to see Manjule shoot a film in Akluj, her village in Solapur district. Her mother knew him, since he is from Solapur. Rajguru was introduced to Manjule, and was asked to audition. She auditioned with dialogue and dancing, and was selected as the female lead. Manjule gave her a year to work on her personality. She played the role of Archana Patil, an upper-caste girl who is the daughter of a wealthy village politician. Twenty-year-old graduate student Akash Thosar was cast as Prashant Kale after he met Bharat Manjule at a railway station and showed him some of his photos. It was shown to Nagraj; Thosar was summoned for auditions and eventually selected for the role of a lower-caste fisherman's son. Tanaji Galgunde and Arbaz Shaikh played supporting roles in the film, and Manjule made a cameo appearance as a cricket commentator.

Filming 

Filming began in February 2014, and ended in May 2015; several portions were shot in Hyderabad. It took nearly 70 days for the entire shoot, usually long for a Marathi film. Manjule cited the reasons being a "lot of locations, a huge number of characters and many complicated crowd scenes" in the film. Thosar had difficulty crying on cue during the audition, and was tense filming the crying scene. Rajguru and Thosar lived with Manjule at his home in Pune for two to three months before filming, where they would discuss the script and rehearse scenes daily. Manjule said that they did not use glycerine, and actually cried while filming the emotional scenes; he made them understand the "layers in their characters".

Manjule occasionally asked the actors what they would say they in a similar situation, prompting improvisation. The director of photography was Sudhakar Reddy Yakkanti and Kutub Inamdar served as the editor. Sairat was produced by Nagraj Manjule's AatPat Productions and Zee Studios. Rajguru, in grade 10, left school for the duration of filming. About the film's ending, Manjule said that he used silence to demonstrate that "two people who are in love and happy can die suddenly." He shot the ending without dialogue or background score, because he wanted "the violence in the scene to hit the audience." Thosar was a bodybuilder, and had to lose weight for the role. Rajguru lost , and worked on her voice for the role. Thosar said that he was like the character of Prashant. Rajguru admired Archana, and said that she was "inspired to be as dashing as Archie."

Soundtrack

Sairat songs and background score were composed by the Ajay–Atul duo, who had worked with Manjule on Fandry in 2013. The soundtrack includes Western classical music recorded at Sony Scoring Stage in Hollywood, California, a first for an Indian film. The four-song album featured vocals by Ajay Gogavale, Shreya Ghoshal and Chinmayi, with lyrics by Ajay–Atul and Manjule. It was released on 1 April 2016 on the Zee Music Company label. The 66-person orchestra – including a 45-piece string section, six-piece woodwind section, 13-piece brass section, six-piece horn section and a harp – was conducted by Mark Graham.

Manjule described the lyrics as "rustic", with a "rural lingo". He said that the language and songs in the film differ from other films where characters inexplicably become poets. Mihir Bhanage of The Times of India called the film's music  a "rarity" and "addictive": "It makes you fall in love with the songs from the word go." Sankhyana Ghosh of The Hindu also gave the album a positive review: "With joyous melodies and stirring orchestral touches, Sairat is an example of old-fashioned film music done right." Lalitha Suhasini of The Indian Express wrote that the score was "audacious" and "makes you laugh, cry and want to fall in love."

The entirety of "Yad Lagla" and "Zingaat" was sampled by the duo in "Pehli Baar" and "Zingaat", which were songs from the film's Hindi remake Dhadak.

Release
Sairat premiered at the 66th Berlin International Film Festival as a part of the Generation 14plus section, where it received a standing ovation. The jury was composed of teenagers. The film was released domestically on 29 April 2016 in about 200 screens. It was released with English subtitles in Maharashtra, Gujarat, Goa, Madhya Pradesh, Delhi, Kolkata, Bhilai, Raipur, Bhiwadi, Karnataka, and Telangana. The film screened at more than 450 theatres, over 50 of which were outside Maharashtra. Due to Sairat popularity, additional shows at midnight and 3:00 am were introduced at a theatre in Rahimatpur in Satara district. The film was also screened at the India Habitat Centre Film Festival, the Brahmaputra Valley Film Festival, the International Film Festival of India and the Indian Film Festival in The Hague post its theatrical release. It was the first Marathi film released in the United Arab Emirates and South Korea.

In April, Manjule filed a complaint with the Mumbai Police after the film was leaked online two days before its theatrical release. The film had a watermark indicating that it was a censor copy, intended for censorship-board officials to review before release. In May 2016, a mobile-shop owner in Pune was arrested for piracy. Cybercrime police arrested a Byculla (Mumbai)-based cable operator for broadcasting the pirated version of Sairat on his network. The film was released on DVD on 1 September 2016, and is also available on Netflix.

Reception

Critical response

Sairat received critical acclaim, with particular praise for Rajguru's performance. Meenakshi Shedde of Forbes India called the film "one of the great triumphs of Indian cinema this year", and a rare example of an "Indian director addressing caste issues from first-hand, lived experience, as distinct from that of a privileged, if empathetic, director." Pratik Ghosh of Daily News and Analysis called it a "gem" which "enriched Marathi cinema". He praised Rajguru: "Sairat remarkable find is the dusky Rinku Rajguru who is sterling as the fearless Archi." Mihir Bhanage gave a positive review: "The film can be divided into two parts; the first one, a dream and the second one, reality and both strike a chord. But the masterstroke of Manjule the story-teller and director, is the climax."

Harish Wankhede in his review in Tehelka called the film 'a radical entry in the populist-fantasy ‘love story’ genre. However he argues that from the very beginning of the film, the female character takes a dynamic lead and gives the story a feminist-heroic tilt. Archi's courage and power is more male-like, vocal and aggressive than Parshya and his two friends. Her heroic posturing and confident outlook make her the lead hero of the film while pushing others to the periphery as dependent characters. The director allows Archie's character to break the stereotypes of a village girl but on the other hand asserts the power of her feudal-upper caste lineage. However, similar considerations are partially applied to her counterpart Dalit characters.

Ganesh Matkari of Pune Mirror described the film as "significant", and not easy to "make or to grasp". Matkari expressed reservations about its length. Divya Unny from OPEN wrote: "The three-hour-long film draws the audience in with plenty of songs and slow-mos, emotion and drama, and then serves us reality right when we aren’t expecting it." Suprateek Chatterjee of HuffPost described it as "soaring" and "gut-wrenching", defying convention "even while sticking to established tropes". J. Hurtado of ScreenAnarchy called the film a "singular, astonishing, breathtaking achievement": "You owe it to yourself to experience the beauty, exhaltation, and pain that Sairat has to offer". Sowmya Rajendran of The News Minute cited it as a "brave film that gets to the root of the matter": "It could have been just another film made on the subject of forbidden teenage love but the maturity with which Nagraj Manjule has crafted his characters and narrative is breath-taking." Uday Bhatia of Mint compared the film to Michael Haneke's Funny Games; "both derive their sting from the way they play with audience expectations—raising hopes, dashing them, then raising them again."

Shweta Parande of India.com called Rajguru's performance "impressive". Rochona Majumdar of The Indian Express wrote a positive review: "To describe it as a story of inter-caste love that ends brutally would be to do grave injustice to Manjule’s portrayal of a slice of contemporary India." Suhas Bhasme of The Wire noted that Sairat positions the issues of "caste discrimination and caste-based violence centre stage, which have often been denied or overlooked by mainstream Marathi movies." Baradwaj Rangan called the film a master class in "how to make the audience laugh, cry, swoon, eat out of your hand": "Sairat talks not just about the realities of caste and class, but of gender too." According to Ranjib Mazumdar of The Quint, the film refreshingly changes gender roles with its strong female character: "[Archie] is like a body of free water, unaware of limits and customs, flowing with a convinced passion we rarely see in our heroines." S. Shivakumar of The Hindu gave the film a positive review, praising Rajguru's performance and Manjule's direction: "Nagraj excels in making the dramatic scenes look realistic, effortlessly manipulating your emotions."

Box office
Sairat earned  on its opening day at the box office. The film earned  in its first week. Its screen count was increased from 400 to 450 in the second week, earning an additional . In addition to Maharashtra, it was released with subtitles in parts of Madhya Pradesh, Karnataka, Delhi and Goa. Sairat also did well on the overseas market. The film earned  in Maharashtra.

Ratings

Awards
Rinku Rajguru received the Special Mention at the 63rd National Film Awards for her "effective portrayal of a lively girl who defies societal norms but ultimately has to face the wrath of her family". Ajay–Atul received six awards at the Mirchi Music Awards Marathi 2017: Album of the Year, Song of the Year, Male Vocalist of the Year, Programmer and Arranger of the Year (for "Yad Lagala"), Composer of the Year and Song Recording and Mixing of the Year (for "Sairat Zala Ji"). The film received 11 awards at the 2017 Filmfare Marathi Awards: Best Film, Best Director, Best Actor (Female), Best Music Album, Best Lyrics, Best Playback Singer (Female), Best Playback Singer (Male), Best Debut Actress, Best Debut Male, Best Dialogue and Best Background Score.

Remakes 
After Sairat success, the film was remade in several Indian languages. Its first remake was the Punjabi film Channa Mereya (2017), directed by Pankaj Batra. It received mixed reviews from critics. Rinku Rajguru reprised her role in the Kannada version, entitled Manasu Mallige (2017). The Odia version, Laila O Laila (2017) was directed by Susant Mani. The film was also remade in Bengali (an Bangladesh-India joint venture) as Noor Jahaan (2018), directed by Abhimanyu Mukherjee. The Hindi remake, Dhadak (directed by Shashank Khaitan and produced by Karan Johar), was released on 20 July 2018. As of July 2016, Rockline Venkatesh held the remake rights for Tamil, Telugu and Malayalam-language films.

Impact
According to Smitha Verma of The Financial Express, Sairat was a turning point for the Marathi film industry which restored faith in distributors of regional cinema. Its lead actors, Rinku Rajguru and Akash Thosar, became overnight celebrities; in January 2017, the Election Commission of India made them brand ambassadors for National Voters' Day to encourage citizens to vote. Karmala, where the film was shot, was visited by nearly 20,000 tourists within three weeks of its release. Three family reconciliations were reported in Mumbai after the film's release, including that of Sachin Lokhande (who was married to a Muslim girl and waited 12 years for both families to agree). His parents approved his marriage after watching Sairat. Several fans of the film formed the Sairat Marriage Group, an organisation with nearly 100 volunteers across Maharashtra, to help runaway couples.

References

External links
 
 

2010s Marathi-language films
2016 films
2016 romantic drama films
Films about interclass romance
Films about the caste system in India
Indian romantic drama films
Marathi films remade in other languages
Films scored by Ajay–Atul